Platon Hryhorovych Kostiuk (20 August 1924 – 10 May 2010) was a Soviet and Ukrainian physiologist, neurobiologist, electrophysiologist, and biophysicist. He was a member (academician) of the National Academy of Sciences (NAS) of Ukraine and the Russian Academy of Sciences. He was also a director of the Bogomoletz Institute of Physiology and the International Center of Molecular Physiology NAS of Ukraine; chair of the Moscow Institute of Physics and Technology, Kyiv branch, vice-president of the NAS of Ukraine, and chairman of the Verkhovna Rada of the Ukrainian SSR.

Biography 
Platon Kostiuk was born in Kyiv to the family of the Ukrainian psychologist Hryhoriy Kostiuk. A native speaker of both Ukrainian and Russian, Kostiuk studied English and German, and graduated from high school when the German–Russian War began in 1941. Kostiuk entered Stalingrad University to study biology and Roman philology. He was later evacuated to Siberia, where he studied medicine till 1945. After half a year of military medical service, he was demobilized for entry into the Department of Biology at Kyiv University. In parallel, he studied psychiatry at Kyiv Medical Institute. Kostiuk worked on his doctoral thesis in Danylo Vorontsov's laboratory of physiology. In his research, he developed microelectrode equipment independently of Judith Graham Pool and Ralph W. Gerard (1949). He completed his doctoral thesis in 1957. In 1958, Kostiuk became Head of the Department of General Nervous System Physiology at the Bogomoletz Institute of Physiology. From 1969 to 2010, he served as the director of the institute.

In 1960–61, Kostiuk was invited to John Eccles' Laboratory in Canberra, Australia to study the mechanisms of synaptic inhibition in the spinal cord. In 1974, he was elected a member (academician) of the Soviet Academy of Science. In 1975–1988, he was the academician-secretary of the Section of Physiology of the academy. In 1975–1990, he was also a deputy in the Verkhovna Rada of the Ukrainian SSR and in 1985–90 was its chairman.

Research 
Platon Kostiuk was the first to introduce microelectrode studies of the nervous system in the USSR. He was the first to prove directly the presence of calcium channels in neuronal cell membranes. Under his supervision, two types of calcium currents were discovered: high-voltage activated and low-voltage activated. He also proposed an original hypothesis on calcium channels' selectivity mechanism.

Awards and chairs 
Kostiuk was a vice-president of the International Union for Physiologycal Sciences from 1989 to 1993.

In 1966, he was elected a Member of the German National Academy of Sciences Leopoldina.

In memoriam 
Kostiuk students established Kostiuk Foundation to support young scientists and promote physiological research in Ukraine. Once a year, the Foundation presents Kostiuk Award to outstanding young researchers in the field of biomedical sciences.

Publications 
He published more than 1000 scientific papers in Ukrainian, Russian, and English. Some of the most important include:

References

External links
 Platon Kostiuk on a NeuroTree
 Platon Kostiuk on a Chemistry Tree
 Helmut Kettenmann. Platon Gregorievich Kostiuk (1924-2010) in memoriam. FENS News, 17 May, 2010
 

-->

1924 births
2010 deaths
20th-century Ukrainian scientists
21st-century Ukrainian politicians
21st-century Ukrainian scientists
Scientists from Kyiv
People from Kiev Governorate
Bogomolets National Medical University alumni
Full Members of the National Academy of Sciences of Ukraine
Full Members of the Russian Academy of Sciences
Full Members of the USSR Academy of Sciences
Members of Academia Europaea
Members of the German Academy of Sciences Leopoldina
Academic staff of the Moscow Institute of Physics and Technology
Taras Shevchenko National University of Kyiv alumni
Chairmen of the Verkhovna Rada of the Ukrainian Soviet Socialist Republic
Ninth convocation members of the Verkhovna Rada of the Ukrainian Soviet Socialist Republic
Tenth convocation members of the Verkhovna Rada of the Ukrainian Soviet Socialist Republic
Eleventh convocation members of the Verkhovna Rada of the Ukrainian Soviet Socialist Republic
Heroes of Socialist Labour
Recipients of the title of Hero of Ukraine
Laureates of the State Prize of Ukraine in Science and Technology
Recipients of the Order of Lenin
Recipients of the Order of Prince Yaroslav the Wise, 5th class
Recipients of the Order of the Red Banner of Labour
Recipients of the USSR State Prize
Soviet biologists
Soviet neuroscientists
Soviet physiologists
Ukrainian biologists
Ukrainian neuroscientists
Ukrainian physiologists
Ukrainian politicians before 1991
Burials at Baikove Cemetery